"México lindo y querido" is a traditional mariachi and ranchera Mexican song written by Chucho Monge and made famous by singer Jorge Negrete ("the singing charro"). It is widely known throughout the Spanish-speaking world for its characterization of patriotism and loyalty for the land of Mexico. It has been covered by many well-known artists, including Bertín Osborne, Ana Gabriel and Vicente Fernández and Pedro Fernández.

The most recognizable stanza of the song states:

See also
"Cielito Lindo"
"La Bamba"

References

External links 
 History of México lindo y querido (Italian)

Spanish-language songs
Mexican folk songs
Mexican patriotic songs
Songs about Mexico